Last Duel: Inter Planet War 2012 is a vertically scrolling shooter released in arcades by Capcom in 1988. It was ported to the Amiga, Amstrad CPC, Atari ST, Commodore 64, and ZX Spectrum.

Plot
Taking place in the year 2012 of an alternate galaxy, Last Duel involves the struggle between two planets Mu and Bacula. On planet Bacula, a strong warrior tribe known as the Galden rose to immense military power and literally conquered all of the societies on the planet. Unsatisfied with conquering just one planet, the Galden decided to conquer a neighboring terrestrial planet, Mu. Using advanced bioships, star fighters and motor vehicles, the Galden invaded Mu, destroying many of its cities and taking the planet's ruler Queen Sheeta hostage.

The remaining royal guards of Mu are deployed in space fighters that can transform into cars to rescue the queen and crush the Galden forces.

Gameplay
The player alternated per level between using car and space ship. The vehicle had two main attacks one of which varied depending on the form the vehicle took. In car mode, the vehicle could jump over pot holes and enemies while in ship mode, the vehicle would perform a barrel roll making it temporarily invincible and altogether dangerous.

The player could select Power-Ups that including a large, slow firing laser, a twin-shot, a wide shot and options that provided side attacks; Speed-Ups were only available in ship mode. Every driving section was timed and if the player was unable to reach the boss on time, they would lose a life. However, the moment the player encountered the boss, the timer would disappear.

Reception
The Spanish magazine Microhobby game the following scores: Originality: 20% Graphics: 70% Motion: 70% Sound: 60% Difficulty: 80% Addiction: 50%

Legacy
Last Duel was re-released in the Capcom Classics Collection - Volume 2 for the PlayStation 2, Xbox, and PlayStation Portable.

References

External links
Last Duel at Arcade History

Last Duel at Lemon Amiga
Last Duel at Atari Mania

1988 video games
Amiga games
Amstrad CPC games
Arcade video games
Atari ST games
Capcom games
Commodore 64 games
U.S. Gold games
Vertically scrolling shooters
Video games developed in Japan
Video games scored by Tamayo Kawamoto
Video games set on fictional planets
ZX Spectrum games